Balmoral is an unincorporated community in Tensas Parish, Louisiana, United States.

See also
Balmoral Mounds

Notes

Unincorporated communities in Tensas Parish, Louisiana
Unincorporated communities in Louisiana